Shirendev Bazaryn (15 May 1912 in present-day Shin-Ider soum, Khovsgol aimag, Mongolia - 8 March 2001 in Ulaanbaatar, Mongolia) was a Mongol historian, academician and prominent statesman. First president and founding figure of the National University of Mongolia (1942) and Mongolian Academy of Sciences (1962).

References 
The information in this article is based on that in its Russian equivalent.

1912 births
2001 deaths
Academic staff of the National University of Mongolia
Foreign Members of the USSR Academy of Sciences
Foreign Members of the Russian Academy of Sciences